Wespelaar is a borough of the municipality of Haacht, located between Kampenhout - Tildonk and Haacht centre in Belgium.

External links 
 Haacht Official website Wespelaar is klein maar fijn er is ook een festival swing. er is een basisschool klimop. en een kleuterschool de pit. er is ook een bakker en een winkel de spar.Er is ook een kerk. Je kan in het bos gaan wandelen het zijn heel mooie wandelingen.

Populated places in Flemish Brabant